David Domenic Di Biase  (1935–2001) was a British dentist. He was best known for developing, together with Arthur Levis (1927–2000), Chief Dental Technician at Southend General Hospital,  the Southend Clasp, a widely used retention component used on removable orthodontic appliances.

Education
Di Biase studied dentistry at King's College London School of Medicine and Dentistry. He graduated with Honours, followed by a short Service Commission in the Royal Air Force between 1961 and 1963. On completion he obtained his Fellowship and Diploma in Orthodontics. During his senior registrar training he won the prestigious Chapman Prize.

Dental career
In 1971 he was appointed Consultant Orthodontist at Southend Hospital. He relinquished sessions in Southend in 1989 to join the teaching staff in the Orthodontic Department at Barts and The London, Queen Mary's School of Medicine and Dentistry.

He gained a significant reputation, publishing and lecturing widely on orthodontics, and developing ideas such as ‘The Southend Clasp’, which is now in wide use throughout the speciality. His other particular interest was in dento-facial orthopaedics for cleft neonates.

Besides his clinical commitments, he played an important political role in dentistry. His overwhelming passion was to see the divided orthodontic speciality in the United Kingdom united under one organisation. To this end he acted as ‘midwife’ to the developing British Orthodontic Society (BOS). He was the first chairman of conference and followed as first chairman of the newly constituted British Orthodontic Society and later as president. He was also secretary and president of the Essex branch of the British Dental Association.

David also served on national organisations, being an elected member of the General Dental Council and he sat on the Standing Dental Advisory Committee Orthodontic Review Group.

In his personal life Di Biase had three passions, his family, art and rugby football. As a rugby player he played for ‘King’s College Hospital', ‘Saracens’ and the Royal Air Force.

1935 births
2001 deaths
Alumni of King's College London
English dentists
Orthodontists
Academics of Barts and The London School of Medicine and Dentistry
20th-century dentists
Military personnel from Surrey
20th-century Royal Air Force personnel
Royal Air Force officers